The term space cylinder refers to a space habitat shaped like a cylinder. Types include:
McKendree cylinder, hypothetical rotating space habitat originally proposed in 2000
O'Neill cylinder, space settlement concept proposed in his 1976

See also
Space sphere